Canal Macau is a Portuguese-language television channel broadcast in Macau, China. Both Canal Macau and its sister, Cantonese language station TDM Ou Mun, are owned by TDM.

Local programmes usually broadcast daily from 7:00 pm to 11:00 pm. As a result, RTP's programmes on RTP Internacional are usually relayed for other time schedules (with the exception of football matches). In addition, The Catholic Mass broadcasts live on Sunday mornings from the Igreja da Sé. Together, these programmes make Canal Macau a 24-hour television service.

See also
Media of Macau

References

External links 
 Official website of TDM

Television in Macau
Portuguese-language television
Portuguese-language television stations
Television channels and stations established in 1984
1984 establishments in Macau